NRP Tridente (S160) is a Tridente class submarine of the Portuguese Navy.

Daytona incident 
In July 2016, Tridente accidentally became entangled in the fishing nets of the French trawler Daytona. Neither the submarine nor the trawler were damaged.

References

Tridente-class submarines
Attack submarines
2010 ships
Maritime incidents in 2016